Franz Miklosich (also known in Slovene as ; 20 November 1813 – 7 March 1891) was a Slovene philologist.

Early life
Miklosich was born in the small village of Radomerščak near the Lower Styrian town of Ljutomer, then part of the Austrian Empire, and baptized Franz Xav. Mikloschitsh. He graduated from the University of Graz with a doctor of philosophy degree.

Career
He was a professor of philosophy at the University of Graz. In 1838, he went to the University of Vienna, where he received a doctor of law decree. During his studies, he became influenced by the works of the Slovenian philologist and linguist Jernej Kopitar. He abandoned law, devoting most of his later life to the study of Slavic languages.

In 1844, he obtained a post at the Imperial Library of Vienna, where he remained until 1862. In 1844, he published a  review of Franz Bopp's book Comparative Grammar, which attracted attention from the Viennese academic circles. This publication then launched a long series of works, in which Miklosich showed immense erudition. His works led to a revolutionary change in the study of Slavic languages.

In 1849 Miklosich was appointed to the newly created chair of Slavic philology at the University of Vienna, and he occupied it until 1886. He became a member of the Academy of Vienna, which appointed him secretary of its historical and philosophical section, a member of the council of public instruction and of the upper house, and correspondent of the French Academy of Inscriptions and Humanities. His numerous writings deal not only with the Slavic languages, but also with Romanian, Aromanian, Albanian, Greek, and Romani.

From 1872 to 1880, Miklosich published his original survey of Romani dialects, Über die Mundarten und Wanderungen der Zigeuner Europas. This work included a discussion of their origins, migration routes, an historical-comparative grammar, and a lexicon. He identified a substantial Greek element that was shared by the Romani dialects, and thus named a "Greek-speaking area" as the "European homeland of the Gypsies".

In 1883, on the occasion of his 70th birthday, he received a medal commissioned by the Austrian Academy of Sciences.

Political engagement
In the Spring of Nations of 1848, Miklosich, who was 35 at the time, actively engaged in the Slovene national movement. He was the chairman of the political association, called Slovenija (Slovenia) organized by Slovene students that studied in Graz and Vienna. Together with Matija Majar and Lovro Toman, he was among the authors who elaborated the political demand for a United Slovenia. After the failure of the revolutionary requests, he again turned to exclusively academic activity.

Selected bibliography

See also

 Austroslavism
 Culture of Slovenia
 Vienna Literary Agreement

Notes

Further reading
Franz Miklosich (Lemma by Katja Sturm-Schnabl, p. 186–193) in: Marija Mitrović, Die Geschichte der slowenischen Literatur von den Anfängen bis zur Gegenwart. Aus dem Serbokroatischen übersetzt, redaktionell bearbeitet und mit ausgewählten Lemmata und Anmerkungen ergänzt von Katja Sturm-Schnabl. Klagenfurt: Mohorjeva-Hermagoras, 2001.  <http://www.hermagoras.at>.
Walter Lukan (ed.): Franz Miklosich (Miklošič): neue Studien und Materialien anläßlich seines 100. Todestages. Vienna 1991 (= Österreichische Osthefte: Sonderheft 33).
Katja Sturm-Schnabl, Der Briefwechsel Franz Miklosich's mit den Südslaven = Korespondenca Frana Miklošiča z Južnimi Slovani, Obzorja, Maribor 1991, XXIV, 855 S., .
Katja Sturm-Schnabl, Franz Miklosich als Wegbegleiter bei der Entstehung der ukrainischen Schriftsprache. In: Juliane Besters-Dilger, Michael Moser, Stefan Simonek (eds.), Sprache und Literatur der Ukraine zwischen Ost und West – Мова та література України між сходом і заходом. Bern: Lang 2000, 195–209.
Katja Sturm-Schnabl, Franz Miklosich – ein "Europäer" im 19. Jahrhundert. Short version http://www.inst.at/studies/s_0104_d.htm
Katja Sturm-Schnabl, Fran Miklošič, An Early Visionary of European Integration in Philological Studies. The Difficult Path Towards the Acceptance of the Concept of Diversity and Plurality. http://cf.hum.uva.nl/natlearn/ 
Katja Sturm-Schnabl, Aktualnost Miklošičevega znanstvenega dela in misli. In: Jezikoslovni zapiski. Glasilo Inštituta za slovenski jezik Frana Ramovša ZRC SAZU 10.2 (2004), 19–46.
 

1813 births
1891 deaths
People from the Municipality of Ljutomer
People from the Duchy of Styria
Slovenian Roman Catholics
Slovene nobility
Austrian knights
Members of the Imperial Diet (Austria)
People of the Revolutions of 1848
Linguists from Slovenia
Slovenian philologists
Slavists
University of Graz alumni
Academic staff of the University of Graz
Academic staff of the University of Vienna
Rectors of universities in Austria
Members of the Austrian Academy of Sciences
Members of the Académie des Inscriptions et Belles-Lettres
Corresponding Members of the Bulgarian Academy of Sciences
Corresponding members of the Saint Petersburg Academy of Sciences
Recipients of the Pour le Mérite (civil class)